The 2011–12 Israeli Women's Cup (Gvia HaMedina Nashim) was the 14th season of Israel's women's nationwide football cup competition.

The competition was won by ASA Tel Aviv University who had beaten Maccabi Kishronot Hadera 2–0 in the final.

The Second Division League Cup was won by F.C. Ramat HaSharon, who had beaten Bnot Caesarea Tiv’on 5–0 in the final.

Results

First round

Quarter-finals

Semi-finals

Final

Gvia Ligat Nashim Shniya

Format
The five second division teams were split into two groups, north and south. The two regional winners met in the final. Since the Northern group had only two teams, they played each other twice.

Northern group

|}

Southern group

Final

References

External links
2011–12 State Cup Women Israeli Football Association 
2011–12 Ligat Nashim Shniya Cup Israeli Football Association 

Israel Women's Cup seasons
cup
Israel